Ed Cocks (born 1979) is a member of parliament in the Australian Capital Territory Legislative Assembly representing the ACT Liberal Party.

A public servant working for the Health Department, Cocks ran unsuccessfully for the Legislative Assembly at the 2016 ACT election and for the federal seat of Bean in 2019. He ran again for Murrumbidgee at the 2020 ACT election. Although not successful at the election, he was elected in a countback on 20 June 2022 following Giulia Jones's resignation.

References 

1979 births
Living people
Members of the Australian Capital Territory Legislative Assembly
21st-century Australian politicians
Liberal Party of Australia members of the Australian Capital Territory Legislative Assembly